What Men Live By (Čím lidé žijí in Czech) is an opera in one act by Bohuslav Martinů to an English libretto by the composer, based on Where Love Is, There God Is Also (1885) by Leo Tolstoy, though he chose to use the more universal title of a different Tolstoy story What Men Live By (1886). It was composed in 1951-1952 when the composer was living in the U.S.A, and described by him as a 'pastoral-opera'.

Performance history
The opera was premiered as a television broadcast in New York in May 1953. The first staged performance took place on 1 August 1954 in Interlochen, Michigan, by the National Music Camp company. Correspondence of the composer shows that he preferred semi-staging for the work which "positively rebels against the full trappings of operatic presentation", and "produced an unpretentious work of quiet, ecstatic beauty and radiant charm". 
After the student staging with piano in 1954, the first performance with orchestra took place in New York the following year, and professional productions were mounted in Plzen and Brno using Czech translation. 
The opera was nominated in the 'Rediscovered Work' Award in the International Opera Awards in 2015, through three Prague concert performances at the Rudolfinum in 2014 at the Martinů Music Days, with Jiří Bělohlávek conducting the Czech Philharmonic Orchestra.
A film of the opera, with soundtrack by the Czech Philharmonic Orchestra conducted by Jiří Bělohlávek in 2014, directed Jiří Nekvasil, was released in 2018.

Roles

Instrumentation
The orchestral score requires 1 flute, 2 oboes, 3 clarinets, 2 bassoons, 2 horns, 1 trumpet, 1 trombone, timpani, percussion (various instruments), piano and strings (6 violins I, 6 violins II, 4 violas, 3 violoncellos, 2 double basses). Apart from the vocal soloists, a small chorus (or a vocal quartet or quintet) is also required.

References
Notes

Operas by Bohuslav Martinů
1953 operas
English-language operas
One-act operas
Operas
Operas for television
Operas based on works by Leo Tolstoy